Thomas Jefferson Wood (September 30, 1844 in Athens County, Ohio – October 13, 1908) was an American politician who was a member of the United States House of Representatives from Indiana.

In 1853, Wood moved from his place of birth to Vigo County, Indiana, with his parents; where he received his education and studied law at Terre Haute, Indiana.  He graduated in law from the University of Michigan in 1867 and began practicing law. Wood moved to Crown Point, Lake County in November 1867 and practiced law there. He served as Lake County's prosecuting attorney from 1872 to 1876.

Wood was a member of the Indiana Senate from 1878 to 1882 and was elected as a Democrat to the 48th United States Congress. He served from March 4, 1883, to March 3, 1885, and was an unsuccessful candidate for reelection.

Wood was a slave owner.

References

1844 births
1908 deaths
University of Michigan Law School alumni
People from Vigo County, Indiana
People from Athens County, Ohio
Democratic Party Indiana state senators
Democratic Party members of the United States House of Representatives from Indiana
Politicians from Terre Haute, Indiana
People from Crown Point, Indiana
19th-century American politicians